FK Šaca is a Slovak association football club located in Šaca which is a borough of Košice. It currently plays in V. liga south.

Colors and badge 
Its colors are blue and white.

References

External links
Official website 
Šaca website 

Football clubs in Slovakia
Association football clubs established in 1956
1956 establishments in Czechoslovakia